Benjamin Alan Carroll (born 12 July 1975) is an Australian politician. He is the representative for the seat of Niddrie in the Victorian Legislative Assembly.

Early years and education

Ben was born in Airport West, Victoria. He attended primary school at St Christopher's Primary, and high school at St Bernard's College. He then studied law at La Trobe University, graduating with honours in 2000. He was admitted as a legal solicitor in 2010. He holds a masters in law from La Trobe, having commenced the degree subsequent to his 2012 election.

Prior to entering politics Ben worked as a sales assistant for Kmart in Airport West, and for the insurance company AAMI in its motor vehicles division. He also worked for the Victorian Government Solicitor between 2009 and 2010.

Political career
Ben Carroll has worked as a political adviser to Steve Bracks, Justin Madden, and Stephen Conroy.

In 2012, Carroll was elected to the seat of Niddrie in a by-election following the resignation of Rob Hulls, and was re-elected in 2014 and 2018.

In December 2014, Carroll was appointed Parliamentary Secretary for Justice in the incoming Andrews Labor Government. In October 2017, he was appointed Minister for Industry and Employment, after the resignation of Wade Noonan from cabinet.

References

External links
 Parliamentary voting record of Ben Carroll at Victorian Parliament Tracker
 Parliament of Victoria: Members Information

1975 births
Living people
Members of the Victorian Legislative Assembly
La Trobe University alumni
Australian Labor Party members of the Parliament of Victoria
Labor Right politicians
Politicians from Melbourne
21st-century Australian politicians
People from the City of Moonee Valley